George Wyatt may refer to:

George Wyatt (writer) (1553–1624), writer on Anne Boleyn, son of rebel Thomas Wyatt
George Wyatt (cricketer) (1850–1926), English cricketer
George Wyatt (author), author of Brains Benton children's mystery books series
George Harry Wyatt (1886–1964), English recipient of the Victoria Cross
Greg Wyatt, American sculptor

See also
George Wyatt House, Somerville, Massachusetts